George Higgins Moses (February 9, 1869December 20, 1944) was a U.S. diplomat and political figure.  He served as a United States senator from New Hampshire and was chosen as the Senate's President pro tempore.

Biography
George H. Moses was born in Lubec, Maine on February 9, 1869.  He was raised in Eastport, Maine, and Franklin, New Hampshire, and graduated from Phillips Exeter Academy in 1887.  He graduated from Dartmouth College in 1890, and was a member of the Psi Upsilon fraternity.  In 1893 he received a Master of Arts degree from Dartmouth.

After graduating, though he considered a job teaching Latin and Greek, he instead joined the Concord Monitor, and became a newspaper editor.

He was private secretary to Governor David H. Goodell from 1889 to 1891.  Moses then went into journalism, working as a reporter, news editor, and chief editor for the Concord Evening Monitor from 1892 to 1918.  Moses was a member of the New Hampshire Forestry Commission from 1893 to 1907, and served as the commission's secretary.  Moses was a delegate to the 1908 Republican National Convention.

In 1909 Moses was appointed by President William Howard Taft to be the United States Minister to Greece and Montenegro, and he served until 1912.  The appointment was a surprise to Moses, who had opposed Taft's nomination for President at the 1908 convention.  Moses was also a delegate to the 1916 Republican National Convention.

In 1918 Moses was elected to the United States Senate from New Hampshire from 1918.  He served until 1933 and was President pro tempore from 1925 to 1933.  During his Senate service Moses was chairman of: the Committee on Printing (Sixty-sixth through Sixty-eighth Congresses); Committee on Post Office and Post Roads (Sixty-ninth and Seventieth Congresses); and Committee on Rules (Seventy-first and Seventy-second Congresses).

Moses won narrowly in his 1918 special election to complete the term of Jacob H. Gallinger, and he was handily reelected in 1920 and 1926.  He ran unsuccessfully for reelection in 1932, losing narrowly to Fred H. Brown in the Democratic landslide that also saw Franklin D. Roosevelt nationally defeat Herbert Hoover in that year's presidential election.  He was a delegate to the 1936 Republican National Convention.

Later life
Moses died in Concord, New Hampshire on December 20, 1944.  He was buried at Franklin Cemetery in Franklin, New Hampshire.

External links

Biography, George Higgins Moses at United States Department of State, Office of the Historian

References

1869 births
1944 deaths
Phillips Exeter Academy alumni
Dartmouth College alumni
Presidents pro tempore of the United States Senate
People from Lubec, Maine
Ambassadors of the United States to Greece
Ambassadors of the United States to Montenegro
New Hampshire Republicans
Republican Party United States senators from New Hampshire
Burials in New Hampshire